Regain Records was a Swedish-based independent record label. The label predominantly released death metal and black metal albums. Regain Records was founded from what remained of the former label, Wrong Again Records, by Per Gyllenbäck in 1997. Wrong Again Records had such bands as In Flames, Cryptopsy, Arch Enemy, and Naglfar among its ranks.

Regain Records' first two releases were Deranged's High on Blood and Embraced's Amorous Anathema, in late 1997. In the first two years of operation, business for the label was slow, due to lack of proper distribution. It was not until Regain Records re-released the first two in Flames albums, Lunar Strain and Subterranean, which were previously released under the name Wrong Again Records, that the label began to prosper.

In 2008, the label was involved in a legal dispute with the band Gorgoroth over their 2008 live album.

Current and former acts

 Acid Drinkers
 Astaroth
 Behemoth
 Bewitched
 Blackwinds
 The Bronx Casket Co
 Centinex
 The Colombos
 Cryptopsy
 Danzig
 Dark Funeral
 Death SS
 Defleshed
 Deranged
 Devils Whorehouse
 Die Zombiejäger
 Dimension Zero
 Dismember
 Embraced
 Endstille
 Enthroned
 Entombed
 Fall Ov Serafim
 Gorgoroth
 Grave
 Hermano
 Karmakanic
 Machinery
 Marduk
 Mefisto
 Mephistofeles
 Merauder
 Murder Island
 Mustasch
 Nifelheim
 Ophiolatry
 Overkill
 Pro-Pain
 Ragnarok
 Reptilian
 Sahara
 Sahg
 Sargatanas Reign
 Satariel
 Setherial
 Space Odyssey
 Tenebre
 Thyrfing
 Time Has Come
 Time Requiem
 Tony Naima & the Bitters
 Torchbearer
 Totalt Jävla Mörker
 Trelldom
 Trendkill
 Trident
 Unanimated
 Vader

See also
 List of record labels

References

External links
 

Black metal record labels
Death metal record labels
Heavy metal record labels
Record labels established in 1997
Swedish record labels